Karl August von Heigel (March 25, 1835 in Munich – September 6, 1905), German novelist, was born, the son of a régisseur or stage-manager of the court theatre in Munich.

In that city he received his early schooling and studied (1854–1858) philosophy at Ludwig Maximilian University of Munich. He was then appointed librarian to Prince Heinrich zu Carolath-Beuthen in Lower Silesia, and accompanied the nephew of the prince on travels.

In 1863 be settled in Berlin, where from 1865 to 1875 he was engaged in journalism. He next resided at Munich, employed in literary work for the king, Ludwig II, who in 1881 conferred upon him a title of nobility. On the death of the king in 1886 he removed to Riva on the Lago di Garda, where he died on September 6, 1905.

Karl von Heigel attained some popularity with his novels:
 Wohin? (1873)
 Die Dame ohne Herz (1873)
 Das Geheimnis des Königs (1891)
 Der Roman einer Stadt (1898)
 Der Maharadschah (1900)
 Die nervöse Frau (1900)
 Die neuen Heiligen (1901)

He also wrote some plays, notably Josephine Bonaparte (1892) and Die Zarin (1883); and several collections of short stories, Neue Erzählungen (1876), Neueste Novellen (1878), and Heitere Erzählungen (1893).

Sources

External links
 
 Works by Karl August von Heigel in the State Library of Berlin
 Online-Texts by Heigel (in German)

1835 births
1905 deaths
Writers from Munich
People from the Kingdom of Bavaria
German male novelists
German male dramatists and playwrights
19th-century German novelists
19th-century German dramatists and playwrights
19th-century German male writers